The Bolognese is a small dog breed of the bichon type, originating in Italy. The name refers to the northern Italian city of Bologna. It is part of the toy dog group and is considered a companion dog.

History 

They belong to the Bichon family group, which includes the Bichon Frise, Bolognese, Maltese, Lowchen, Havanese and Coton de Tulear. 

The precise ancestry of the Bolognese is unknown.

Bolognese dogs may be seen in tapestry work produced by Flemish craftsmen dating as far back as the 17th century. The Venetian painter Titian painted the Duke Federico Gonzaga with his Bolognese. The breed is also seen in paintings by Goya, Gosse and Watteau. Other notable owners of the breed include Catherine the Great of Russia (1729–1796), Madame de Pompadour (1721–1764) and Empress Maria Theresa of Austria.

The breed was brought into England in 1990 by Liz Stannard and is first shown during that year in the breed registry. In 2001 the breed was able to be shown at all shows with their own classes. They were at Crufts, an annual international dog show, for the first time in 2002.

Description

The distinctive single coat (i.e., no undercoat) falls in loose open ringlets/flocks all over the body, with shorter hair on the face. The hair's texture is woolly, as opposed to silky, and is never trimmed or clipped unless kept as pets. The hair sheds very little, but requires regular combing to prevent matting.

The Bolognese are often described as non-moulting dogs, and while this is not entirely true, their shedding is minimal and generally unnoticeable. For this reason, the Bolognese are considered a hypoallergenic breed.

The average life span of the Bolognese is 14 years.

References

FCI breeds
Companion dogs
Dog breeds originating in Italy
Rare dog breeds
Toy dogs
Bichon